Echephron (Ancient Greek: Ἐχέφρων, gen.: Ἐχέφρωνος) is the name of three characters in Greek mythology.

Echephron, a prince of Pylos and son of King Nestor and Eurydice (or Anaxibia). He was the brother of Thrasymedes, Pisidice, Polycaste, Perseus, Stratichus, Aretus, Pisistratus and Antilochus.
Echephron, a Trojan prince as one of the sons of Priam, king of Troy.
Echephron, son of Heracles and Psophis, daughter of Eryx, a Sicilian despot. He changed the name of the city Phegia (the old Erymanthus) to Psophis.

Notes

References 

 Homer, The Odyssey with an English Translation by A.T. Murray, PH.D. in two volumes. Cambridge, MA., Harvard University Press; London, William Heinemann, Ltd. 1919. Online version at the Perseus Digital Library. Greek text available from the same website.
 Pausanias, Description of Greece with an English Translation by W.H.S. Jones, Litt.D., and H.A. Ormerod, M.A., in 4 Volumes. Cambridge, MA, Harvard University Press; London, William Heinemann Ltd. 1918. Online version at the Perseus Digital Library
 Pausanias, Graeciae Descriptio. 3 vols. Leipzig, Teubner. 1903.  Greek text available at the Perseus Digital Library.
 Pseudo-Apollodorus, The Library with an English Translation by Sir James George Frazer, F.B.A., F.R.S. in 2 Volumes, Cambridge, MA, Harvard University Press; London, William Heinemann Ltd. 1921. Online version at the Perseus Digital Library. Greek text available from the same website.

Trojans
Heracleidae
Children of Heracles
Characters in the Odyssey
Princes in Greek mythology
Children of Priam
Pylian characters in Greek mythology
Children of Nestor (mythology)